Marian Tałaj (born 22 December 1950 in Koszalin) is a Polish former judoka who competed in the 1972 Summer Olympics and in the 1976 Summer Olympics.

References

1947 births
Living people
Polish male judoka
Olympic judoka of Poland
Judoka at the 1972 Summer Olympics
Judoka at the 1976 Summer Olympics
Olympic bronze medalists for Poland
Olympic medalists in judo
People from Koszalin
Sportspeople from West Pomeranian Voivodeship
Medalists at the 1976 Summer Olympics